The Portuguese Legion (French: Légion portugaise; Portuguese: Legião Portuguesa) was a 9,000 men strong Portuguese military unit integrated in the army of the First French Empire, formed after the French occupation of Portugal in 1807.

The Legion was created by order of Napoleon from 12 November 1807. Organization began in February 1808, with the best units of the disbanded Portuguese Army, including the elite Legion of Light Troops. It set out for Salamanca in April 1808, crossing Spain until arriving in France. During the crossing of Spain, many of its soldiers defected, returning to Portugal and joining the Portuguese resistance against the French occupation.

The Portuguese Legion took part in the French campaigns in Germany, Austria and Russia, suffering heavy casualties. It fought at the battles of Wagram, Smolensk, Borodino (Moscow) and Berezina.

The Legion was disbanded on 5 May 1814, with only about 1,000 of its original 9,000 soldiers surviving and returning to Portugal.

Organization
The Portuguese Legion was organized as a division, originally including:
 Five regiments of light infantry
 A battalion of chasseurs à pied
 Three regiments of chasseurs à cheval
 A battery of artillery
 An infantry depot battalion
 A cavalry depot squadron

For the 1809 campaign, the 13th Elite Demi-brigade was created, with three battalions, made from elements of the several infantry regiments of the Legion. The 13th Demi-brigade was part of Oudinot's II Corps.

In 1811, the Portuguese Legion was reorganized in:
 Three regiments of infantry
 A regiment of chasseurs à cheval
 A depot battalion

In 1813, after suffering heavy casualties, the remains of the Legion were organized as:
 A battalion de guerre
 A depot battalion

References 

 Artur, Ribeiro, Legião Portuguesa ao Serviço de Napoleão (1808–1813), Lisboa, Ferin, 1901.
 Banha, Teotónio, Apontamentos para a História da Legião Portuguesa, Lisboa, 1863.
 Boppe, P., La Legion Portugaise 1807–1813,  Paris, 1897, p. 497.
 Esdaile, Charles, The Peninsular War, London, 2003, pp. 28–29.

Military units and formations of the Napoleonic Wars
French military units and formations of the Napoleonic Wars
Portuguese Army
Military units and formations established in 1807
France–Portugal relations
Military units and formations disestablished in 1814